Joan of France (24 January 1391 – 27 September 1433) was Duchess of Brittany by marriage to John V. She was a daughter of Charles VI of France and Isabeau of Bavaria. She ruled Brittany during the imprisonment of her spouse in 1420.

Life

Joan married John V, Duke of Brittany, in 1396. Three years after the wedding, her spouse became duke and she duchess of Brittany.

As duchess, Joan is perhaps most known for her role during the conflict between John V and the Counts of Penthièvre. The Penthièvre branch had lost the Breton War of Succession in the 1340s. As a result, they lost the ducal title of Brittany to the Montforts. The conclusion to the conflict took many years to confirm until 1365 when the Treaty of Guérande was signed. Despite the military loss and the diplomatic treaty, the Counts of Penthièvre had not renounced their ducal claims to Brittany and continued to pursue them. In 1420, they invited John V to a festival held at Châtonceaux. He accepted the invitation, but when he arrived, he was captured and kept prisoner.

The Counts of Penthiève then spread rumours of his death, and moved him to a new prison each day. Joan of France called upon all the barons of Brittany to respond. They besieged all the castles of the Penthièvre family one by one. Joan ended the conflict by seizing the dowager countess of Penthièvre, Margaret of Clisson, and forcing her to have the duke freed.

Joan died in 1433, during her husband's reign.

A Book of Hours by the Bedford Master, Heures Lamoignon, was dedicated to her.

Issue 
She had seven children:

Anne (1409 – c. 1415)
 Isabella (1411 – c. 1442), who in 1435 married Guy XIV of Laval and had 3 children with him.
Margaret (1412 – c. 1421)
 Francis I (1414 – c. 1450), duke of Brittany
Catherine (1416 – c. 1421)
 Peter II (1418 – c. 1457), duke of Brittany
 Gilles (1420 – c. 1450), seigneur of Chantocé.

Sources 

The original version of this page was a translation of :fr:Jeanne de France (1391-1433). From January 2013 the translation has been refined. 

1391 births
1433 deaths
House of Valois
People of the Hundred Years' War
French princesses
Duchesses of Brittany
14th-century Breton women
15th-century Breton women
Daughters of kings
15th-century women rulers